Forest City Realty Trust, Inc., formerly Forest City Enterprises, was a real estate investment trust that invested in office buildings, shopping centers and apartments in Boston, Chicago, Dallas, Denver, Los Angeles, Philadelphia, and the greater metropolitan areas of New York City, San Francisco and Washington, D.C. The company was organized in Maryland with its headquarters in Cleveland, Ohio. As of December 31, 2017, the company owned 29 office buildings, 29 shopping centers, and 78 apartment complexes. On December 7, 2018, the company was acquired by Brookfield Asset Management.

History
In 1920, Forest City was founded as a family-owned lumber and household hardware business by siblings Charles, Leonard, Max and Fannye Ratner, immigrants from Poland. Beginning in the 1930s, the company invested in residential garages, apartments, retail strip centers. During World War II, the company manufactured and prefabricated governmental housing.

In 1960, Forest City became a publicly-traded company. In 1987, the company sold its retail lumber business to Handy Andy Home Improvement Center.

In 2011, the company sold a 49% stake in a retail portfolio in New York for $172.3 million. In 2013, the company acquired a 100% interest in a mall in Pittsburgh. The company also sold a Sheraton hotel in Station Square in Pittsburgh for $61 million. It also announced plans to redevelop Ballston Common Mall. The company acquired a key parcel from Macy's for $13.4 million.

In 2016, for tax purposes, the company converted into a real estate investment trust. The company also sold its stake in the Brooklyn Nets and the Barclays Center to Mikhail Prokhorov, sold its military housing division to Hunt Companies for $208.8 million, sold Terminal Tower to K&D Group for $38.5 million, and sold 7.7 acres and 8 buildings in Cleveland to an investor group for $3.5 million.

In June, 2017 Forest City shareholders voted to eliminate the dual share structure that had enabled the founding Ratner family to control the company. The City of New York also filed a lawsuit against the company in conjunction with the rent due pursuant to a ground lease.

In August, 2017 the company sold 25 acres in Cleveland. In October, 2017 the company sold its interests in 10 malls to Queensland Investment Corporation for $1.55 billion.

On December 7, 2018, the company was acquired by Brookfield Asset Management.

Investments

Notable projects that were owned by the company are:

 8 Spruce Street, also known as "New York by Gehry", for its designer, Frank Gehry.
 Pacific Park, Brooklyn, a mixed-use development in Brooklyn that includes the Barclays Center.
 Central Station, a primarily residential development on the site of a former railroad terminal in Chicago.
 Mercantile National Bank Building, a mixed-use urban redevelopment project of a historical office complex in Dallas.
 Mesa del Sol, planned for 100,000 inhabitants in Albuquerque, is the company's largest mixed-use development, co-owned by Covington Capital Partners.
 New York Times Building, a 52-story building in Midtown Manhattan designed by architect Renzo Piano.
 Northfield Stapleton is an open-air,  retail town center at the company's mixed-use redevelopment project at Stapleton International Airport in Denver.
 Public Health Service Hospital District in San Francisco's Presidio.
 Radian, a 26-story, curved residential tower in the Financial District of Boston.
 Showcase Mall, a shopping center on the Las Vegas Strip.
 Short Pump Town Center, an outdoor mall in Richmond, Virginia.
 Station Square, a  indoor and outdoor shopping, dining and entertainment complex in Pittsburgh.
 University Park at MIT, a mixed-use urban redevelopment project on an abandoned industrial site near the Massachusetts Institute of Technology in Cambridge, Massachusetts.
 Victoria Gardens, a mixed-use shopping center development in Rancho Cucamonga, California.
 Westchester's Ridge Hill, an upscale, urban open-air shopping center in Yonkers, New York anchored by Lord & Taylor, until the store closed in 2020.
 Westfield San Francisco Centre, an upscale, urban shopping center in San Francisco co-owned and managed by The Westfield Group.

References

1920 establishments in Ohio
Defunct real estate companies of the United States
Forest City Realty Trust
Real estate companies established in 1920
Ratner family